The men's half marathon event at the 1999 Summer Universiade was held on 11 July in Palma de Mallorca, Spain.

Results

References

Athletics at the 1999 Summer Universiade
1999